Bchaaleh (alternatively spelled Bcheale, Bchealeh or Bshaaleh) is a village in the Batroun District of the North Governorate in Lebanon.

It had 1,456 eligible voters in the 2009 elections, and the residents mainly belonged to the  Maronite Church.

Geography
The village of Bchaaleh stands on a promontory, with views of the sea and across Douma. It is home to traditional houses and to Saint Stephan church, one of the largest in the region of Batroun. To the north-east of the village, a citadel is built on the ruins of a medieval fortress, erected itself on Phoenicians ruins destroyed by the Romans.

Twelve olive trees still live in the village of Bchaaleh, at more than 1200m above sea level. It is said that they are the oldest olive trees in the world. Different studies and research present data on the age of the Sisters Olive Trees of Noah in Bchaaleh. Some claim they are "between five and seven thousand years old". Another study carried out in French Laboratories in 2017 showed that the trees are a bit older than two thousand years.

Etymology 
Syriac origin, "Beit Chaali", meaning "the place of glorification and adoration".

Solar power
In  2017  Bchaaleh installed a  solar farm, and hence  managed to avoid the worst effects of the 2021 Lebanese blackout.

See also
 List of oldest trees
 List of individual trees
 List of long-living organisms

References

External links 
 Bcheaali, Localiban
 Photos of the Olive Trees of Bcheale on Panoramio.com
 Sisters olive trees of Noah website about the town of Bcheale 
 OLEA - images of the olive trees of Bcheale
 "The sisters olive trees of noah, the last sentinels of the north"—article by the Association for the protection of Lebanese heritage
Village website
Weather and climate from Accuweather
Bchaaleh from Les Plus Beaux Villages du Liban 

Batroun District
Batroun
Tourist attractions in Lebanon
Maronite Christian communities in Lebanon